James L. Linderman was a member of the Wisconsin State Assembly.

Biography
Linderman was born on April 4, 1827 in Ithaca, New York. On February 8, 1849, he married Abigail Williams. Linderman settled in Osseo, Wisconsin in 1872. He died on October 6, 1906 in Osseo and was buried there.

Legislative career
Linderman was a member of the Assembly during the 1877 session.< In 1890, he was a candidate for the Wisconsin State Senate. He was a Republican.

References

External links

Ancestry.com

Politicians from Ithaca, New York
People from Osseo, Wisconsin
Republican Party members of the Wisconsin State Assembly
1827 births
1906 deaths
Burials in Wisconsin
19th-century American politicians